Sympecma paedisca, known generally as siberian winterdamsel, is a species of spreadwing in the damselfly family Lestidae. It is found in Europe.

The IUCN conservation status of Sympecma paedisca is "LC", least concern, with no immediate threat to the species' survival. The IUCN status was reviewed in 2014.

References

Further reading

 

Lestidae
Articles created by Qbugbot
Insects described in 1877